Georgi Minchev is the name of:

 Georgi Minchev (musician) (1943–2001), Bulgarian rock singer and musician
 Georgi Minchev (composer) (born 1939), Bulgarian classical music composer
 Georgi Minchev (footballer) (born 1995), Bulgarian footballer